Donacochara is a genus of dwarf spiders that was first described by Eugène Louis Simon in 1884.  it contains only two species: D. deminuta and D. speciosa.

See also
 List of Linyphiidae species (A–H)

References

Araneomorphae genera
Linyphiidae
Spiders of Africa
Spiders of Asia